The Central Oklahoma–Northeastern State football rivalry, commonly referred to as the Battle for the President's Cup, is an American college football rivalry game played annually between the Central Oklahoma Bronchos football team of the University of Central Oklahoma from Edmond, Oklahoma, and the Northeastern State RiverHawks football team of Northeastern State University from Tahlequah, Oklahoma. Both schools currently compete in the NCAA Division II level, and are members of the Mid-America Intercollegiate Athletics Association (MIAA). Central Oklahoma, formerly Central State, has a 53–27–2 advantage in the series but Northeastern State has kept the series record close since the introduction of the President's cup in 1998. 

Prior to membership in the MIAA, both schools participated in the Oklahoma Collegiate Athletic Conference, the Oklahoma Intercollegiate Conference and most recently the Lone Star Conference since NSU joined the league in 1997.

Central Oklahoma has won the only postseason game between the schools, a 1982 NAIA football Playoff Semifinal Game. 

Beginning in 1998 after Northeastern State upgraded to NCAA Division II, the Bronchos and the Redmen, (now the RiverHawks) have played for the President's Cup. Central Oklahoma leads the trophy series with a 15–9 record in the President's Cup series. The schools also have an intense rivalry in basketball as well.

Game results

A During the 1982 college football season, the teams played twice; in this case, the second meeting was in the playoffs.

See also  
 List of NCAA college football rivalry games

References

College football rivalries in the United States
Central Oklahoma Bronchos football
Northeastern State RiverHawks football
1902 establishments in Oklahoma Territory